Malwanahinna is a village in Sri Lanka. It is located within Central Province.
Malwanahinna is a village located in Kandy district, Akurana Pradeshya Shaba,

See also
List of towns in Central Province, Sri Lanka

External links

Populated places in Kandy District